The Black-Yellow Alliance (SGA) is a monarchist movement in Austria founded on 6 August 2004. Their aim is the restoration of monarchy in Austria as well as a Central European monarchic union of the states which have emerged after the dissolution of Austria-Hungary.

History
After more than 800 years of rule of the House of Habsburg, the Austrian monarchy ended after the Entente Powers won World War I, and a republic was introduced. The Black-Yellow Alliance was established by a group of monarchists from different organizations in 2004.

The Black-Yellow Alliance calls for the reintroduction of a hereditary monarchy in Central Europe and advocates a union of Austria, Hungary, Croatia, the Czech Republic, Slovenia, and Slovakia, united under a common emperor.

Leaders 
 The president of the organization was tourism school professor Dr. Helga Vereno until 6 December 2013(?).
 As of 2017, the chairperson of the party is Nicole Fara.

References

External links
Official website

2004 establishments in Austria
Monarchism in Austria
Monarchist organizations
Conservatism in Austria